Events in the year 1912 in Japan. In the history of Japan, it marks the final year of the Meiji period, Meiji 45 (明治45年), upon the death of Emperor Meiji on July 30, and the beginning of the Taishō Period, Taishō 1 (大正元年), upon the accession of his son Emperor Taishō.

Incumbents
Emperor:
Emperor Meiji (until July 30)
Emperor Taishō (starting July 30)
Prime Minister:
Saionji Kinmochi (until December 21)
Katsura Tarō (starting December 21)

Governors
Aichi Prefecture: Ichizo Fukano then Kenzo Ishihara
Akita Prefecture: Mori Masataka then Toyosuke Haneda
Aomori Prefecture: Takeda Chiyosaburo
Ehime Prefecture: Egi Yasunao
Fukui Prefecture: Nakamura Junkuro then Tokiwa Ikematsu
Fukushima Prefecture: Morisuke Yamayoshi
Gifu Prefecture: Sadakichi Usu
Gunma Prefecture: Uruji Kamiyama
Hiroshima Prefecture: Tadashi Munakata then Nakamura Junkuro
Ibaraki Prefecture: Keisuke Sakanaka then Okada
Iwate Prefecture: Shinichi Kasai
Kagawa Prefecture: Kogoro Kanokogi
Kochi Prefecture: Shoichi Omori
Kumamoto Prefecture: Kawaji Toshikyo then Tadashi Munakata then Ueyama Mitsunoshin
Kyoto Prefecture: Shoichi Omori
Mie Prefecture: Kamon Furusha
Miyagi Prefecture: 
Miyazaki Prefecture: 
Nagano Prefecture: 
Nara Prefecture: 
Niigata Prefecture: 
Oita Prefecture: 
Okayama Prefecture: 
Okinawa Prefecture: 
Osaka Prefecture: 
Saga Prefecture: 
Saitama Prefecture: 
Shiname Prefecture: 
Tochigi Prefecture: 
Tokushima Prefecture: 
Tokyo: 
Tottori Prefecture: 
Toyama Prefecture: 
Yamagata Prefecture: 
Yamaguchi Prefecture: 
Yamanashi Prefecture:

Events
January 21 – Japan's first skiing competition is held at Takada in Niigata Prefecture.
January 28 –  Lieutenant Nobu Shirase and 27 others reach a point at the South Pole 80 degrees 5' south and 156 degrees 37'. They name it Yamato Sekihara.
March unknown date – Yanmar has founded, as predecessor name was Yamaoka Engineer Works.
March 27 – Tokyo Mayor Yukio Ozaki gives 3,000 Cherry blossom trees to be planted in Washington, D.C., to symbolize the friendship between the two countries.
April 1 – Yoshimoto Kogyo was founded.
May 5–July 22 – Japan competes at the Summer Olympic Games for the first time at the 1912 Summer Olympics in Stockholm, Sweden.
May 15 – 1912 Japanese general election: The result was a victory for the Rikken Seiyūkai party, which won 209 of the 381 seats. The 381 members of the House of Representatives were elected in 51 multi-member constituencies based on prefectures and cities. Voting was restricted to men aged over 25 who paid at least 10 yen a year in direct taxation.
June 5 – Tsuruko Haraguchi is awarded a PhD in psychology from Columbia University, becoming the first Japanese woman to earn a PhD in any field.
July 30 – Emperor Meiji dies. He is succeeded by his son Yoshihito who becomes Emperor Taishō. In the history of Japan, the event marks the end of the Meiji period and the beginning of the Taishō period.
September 13 – Burial of Emperor Meiji in Kyoto.
December – Taishō political was in crisis.
December 21 – Saionji Kinmochi resigns as Prime Minister of Japan and is succeeded by Katsura Tarō.
date unknown
 Ebara Corporation was founded.
 Mori Women's School, as predecessor of Kobe Gakuin University was founded in Hyogo Prefecture.

Births
January 1 – Toshia Mori, actress (d. 1995)
February 3 – Kazuo Dan, novelist and poet (d. 1976)
February 20 – Seiji Hisamatsu, film director (d. 1990)
February 29 – Taiichi Ohno, industrial engineer and businessman (d. 1990)
March 27 – Ken'ichi Yoshida, literary scholar (d. 1977)
April 19 – Genji Keita, novelist and writer (d. 1985)
April 22 – Kaneto Shindo, film director and producer (d. 2012)
June 5 – Ryūtarō Ōtomo, film actor (d. 1985)
July 20 – Hideo Itokawa, rocket scientist (d. 1999)
August 2 – Masaaki Iinuma, aviator, flew the first Japanese-built aircraft from Japan to Europe (d. 1941)
August 15 – Naoto Tajima, athlete (d. 1990)
September 22 – Masao Harada, athlete (d. 2000)
October 4 – Hirohide Fushimi, Navy career Officer (d. 1943)
December 5 – Keisuke Kinoshita, film director (d. 1998)
December 10 – Tetsuji Takechi, theater and film director (d. 1988)

Deaths
January 4 – Higashikuze Michitomi, statesman (b. 1834)
January 27 – Nishi Kanjirō, career soldier (b. 1846)
February 12 – Tsunetaro Moriyama, baseball player (b. 1880)
March 13 – Nishi Tokujirō politician and diplomat (b. 1847)
April 2 – Ishimoto Shinroku, general (b. 1854)
April 13 – Takuboku Ishikawa, poet (b. 1886)
April 28 – Yuri Kimimasa, politician (b. 1829)
July 30 – Emperor Meiji, 122nd Emperor of Japan (b. 1852)
September 13:
Nogi Maresuke, general and Governor-General of Taiwan (suicide) (b. 1849)
Nogi Shizuko, wife of Nogi Maresuke (suicide) (b. 1859)
September 23 – Yokoyama Sakujiro, judoka (b. 1864)
October 5 – Hozumi Yatsuka, law scholar (b. 1860)
December 2 – Kawasaki Shōzō, industrialist and shipbuilder (b. 1837)
December 13 – Yūjirō Motora, psychologist (b. 1858)
Unknown:
Toyohara Chikanobu, woodblock artist (b. 1838)
Suzuki Shin'ichi II, photographer (b. 1855)

References

 
1910s in Japan
Japan
Years of the 20th century in Japan